Bosniaks are the fourth largest ethnic group in Serbia after Serbs, Hungarians and Roma, numbering 145,278 or 2.02% of the population according to the 2011 census. They are concentrated in south-western Serbia, and their cultural centre is Novi Pazar.

Politics 

The first major political organising of the Sandžak Muslims happened at the Sjenica conference, held in August 1917, during the Austrian-Hungarian occupation of the Sanjak of Novi Pazar. The Muslim representatives at the conference decided to ask the Austrian-Hungarian authorities to separate the Sanjak of Novi Pazar from Serbia and Montenegro and merge it with Bosnia and Herzegovina, or at least to give an autonomy to the region.

After the end of the World War I and the creation of the Kingdom of Serbs, Croats and Slovenes in 1918, the Sandžak region also become a part of the newly created country. At the Constitutional Assembly election held in 1920, the Sandžak Muslims voted for the People's Radical Party. The main reason for supporting the radicals was a promise made to several influential Muslims that they would be compensated for losing their lands during the agrarian reform.

In order to protect their interests, the Sandžak Muslims organised themselves jointly with the Albanians in the Džemijet party, that covered the area of the present-day Kosovo, North Macedonia and Sandžak. The main goal of the Džemijet was the protection of interests of the Slavic Muslims and Albanians. Džemijet was founded in 1919 in Skopje and was led by Nexhip Draga and later by his brother Ferhat Bey Draga. After it was founded in Skopje, branches of the party were soon founded in Kosovo, Sandžak and the rest of Macedonia. District and municipal branches in Sandžak were founded at a meeting of Džemijet held in Novi Pazar in 1922. The meeting was highly attended, and it insisted upon Muslim unity instead of division by various political parties.

One of the most important political party is the Party of Democratic Action of Sandžak led by Sulejman Ugljanin, which has parliamentary representation and has participated in coalition governments.

Religion 
According to the 2011 Census, almost all Bosniaks in Serbia are Muslim (99.5%). The remainder is not religious or did not declare their religion. The Bosniaks make up the basis or 75% of the Muslim community in Serbia, while most other Muslims being ethnic Albanians or Romani.

Demographics
Bosniaks, as ethnic minority, are primarily the ones living in south-western Serbia, in the region historically known as Sandžak, which is today divided between the states of Serbia and Montenegro. Colloquially referred to as Sandžaklije by themselves and others, Bosniaks form the majority in three out of six municipalities in the Serbian part of Sandžak: Novi Pazar (77.1%), Tutin (90%) and Sjenica (73.8%) and comprise an overall majority of 59.6%. The town of Novi Pazar is a cultural center of the Bosniaks in Serbia. Many Bosniaks from the Sandžak area left after the fall of the Ottoman Empire to continental Turkey. Over the years a large number of Bosniaks from the Sandžak region left to other countries, such as Bosnia and Herzegovina, Turkey, Germany, Sweden, United States, Canada, Australia, etc. A second group is formed by Bosniaks that came from Bosnia and Herzegovina to the largest cities in Serbia during 20th century as economic migrants and inter-Yugoslav migrations.

Today, the majority of Bosniaks are Sunni Muslim and adhere to the Hanafi school of thought, the largest and oldest school of Islamic law in jurisprudence within Sunni Islam. Some in this region who identify as Bosniak do so on account of religious identity as Muslims, but are ethnically Albanian and live in villages (Boroštica, Doliće, Ugao) located in the Pešter region. They have adopted a Bosniak identity in censuses, due to inter-marriage, during the period of SFR Yugoslavia, or due to sociopolitical discrimination against Albanians following the break-up of SFRJ.

Notable people

Politics
Ejup Ganić, former president of the Federation of Bosnia and Herzegovina
Rasim Ljajić, Deputy Prime Minister of Government of Serbia and Minister of Foreign and Internal Trade and Telecommunications
Sulejman Ugljanin,  president of the Party of Democratic Action of Sandžak and the Bosniac National Council
Suad Kurtćehajić, Bosnian political analyst

Military people
Hasan Zvizdić, commander of a detachment of Sandžak Muslim militia
Sefer Halilović, the former general and commanding officer of the Bosnian army during the 1992–95 war in Bosnia and Herzegovina.

Religion
Muamer Zukorlić, ex-mufti and president of SPP (Party of Justice and Conciliation).

Sports
Mustafa Hasanagić, footballer 
Enver Hadžiabdić, footballer 
Adem Ljajić, footballer 
Enver Alivodić, footballer 
Erhan Mašović, footballer 
Fahrudin Mustafić, footballer
Mirsad Türkcan, born as Mirsad Jahović, basketball player 
Hedo Türkoğlu, Turkish basketball player
Alem Toskić, handballer and European Championship silver medalist
Mirsad Terzić, handballer
Asmir Kolašinac, shot putter and European Indoor Champion
Amela Terzić, middle-distance runner and two-time European U23 Champion
Marco Huck, professional boxer and former WBO cruiserweight champion

Performing arts
Saban Saulic, The King of Folk
Irfan Mensur, theatre, television and film actor
Emina Jahović, singer
Mirza Šoljanin, Bosnian singer
Senad Hadžifejzović, Bosnian journalist, news anchor and TV host.

Other
Dina Džanković, 2005 Miss Serbia and Montenegro

See also 

 Bosniaks of Montenegro
 Islam in Serbia
 Muslims (ethnic group)

References

Notes

Sources

External links 
Congress of North American Bosniaks
Sandzakpress.net

 
Bosniak diaspora
Ethnic groups in Serbia
Islam in Serbia
Muslim communities in Europe